The Vienna Islamic Centre is the largest mosque in Austria, located in Vienna's 21st district Floridsdorf.

History 
In 1969 the Islamic Community in Vienna purchased a  plot from the city of Vienna in order to build a mosque. Due to financial difficulties the start of construction had to be postponed several times. In 1975 Saudi king Faisal bin Abdulaziz al Saud pledged to finance the construction of the mosque himself.

After Richard Lugner was selected as general contractor, construction work began on 1 July 1977. On 20 November 1979 the Vienna Islamic Centre was inaugurated by Rudolf Kirchschläger, President of Austria at the time. This event was covered in the local media, such as a report in the Zeit im Bild on the inauguration day.

Mosque 

Gallery

See also 
 Islam in Austria
 List of mosques in Europe

References

External links

 Website of Vienna Islamic Centre

1979 establishments in Austria
Mosques completed in 1979
Buildings and structures in Floridsdorf
Religious buildings and structures in Vienna
Mosques in Austria
Mosque buildings with domes
20th-century architecture in Austria